is a 1952 Japanese film directed by Yasujirō Ozu. The screenplay concerns a wealthy middle-aged couple (played by Shin Saburi and Michiyo Kogure) who have marital difficulties, and their niece who uses the couple's troubles as her excuse for not attending arranged marriage interviews.

Plot
Taeko and Mokichi Satake are a childless married couple living in Tokyo. The husband, whom the wife thinks dull, is an executive at an engineering company.

Taeko's friend Aya persuades Taeko to falsely claim to her husband that Taeko's brother's daughter, Setsuko, is ill, so that she can go to a spa with a couple of friends. The plan goes wrong when Setsuko visits her house unexpectedly, but Taeko substitutes the invalid with another friend and obtains consent from her husband to go for a break. At the spa, the four women drink sake and look at the koi in the pond, comparing a slow moving black one to Taeko's husband.

A few days later, Taeko, Aya, and another friend attend a baseball game. They see Aya's husband in the company of another woman, possibly from a bar that he goes to. A public announcement at the game requests that Taeko go home immediately. She does, where Setsuko, who called in the announcement, tells her that her parents want to set up an arranged marriage for her.

After dinner together, Mokichi and Noboru play Pachinko, and Mokichi meets up with an army buddy who now runs the parlor.

Taeko visits her family in Oiso, where they talk about Setsuko and the arranged marriage. Setsuko's family tasks Taeko to act as matchmaker for Setsuko at a kabuki theater; Setsuko runs off midway through the performance. She goes to see her uncle Mokichi, who is planning with Noboru to go to the bicycle races. Setsuko thinks that arranged marriages are old fashioned. Seeing that Mokichi and Taeko are not happy after their arranged marriage, she is determined to find her own spouse. Mokichi brings her back to the theater and leaves with Noboru for the bicycle races. Setsuko once again escapes from the arranged marriage meeting at the kabuki theater and meets with Mokichi and Noboru at the bicycle races.

One evening, Mokichi, Noboru, and Setsuko are playing pachinko at a parlor. Mokichi leaves early to go home. Noboru and Setsuko go to a ramen noodle house where they eat and talk about arranged marriages. Later, Setsuko goes to her uncle's house, where Taeko is fuming. Taeko demands that Mokichi scold Setsuko for not showing up for the arranged marriage meeting, which he does as long as his wife is in earshot. Taeko confronts Mokichi about being with Setsuko without informing her. The two have an argument, when Mokichi tells her that he finds his old habits hard to break because smoking inferior cigarettes and traveling third-class on a train remind him of the simpler pleasures of life. Taeko, who likes travelling in the first class train cars, leaves in a huff. She becomes so angry that she refuses to speak to her husband for days.

Taeko goes on a train journey by herself away from Tokyo without informing Mokichi. Mokichi's company is sending him to Uruguay on a business trip, and he telegrams her, asking her to return right away without saying why. Everyone goes to the airport to see Mokichi leave. Taeko was not at the airport and returns home only after Mokichi's airplane has flown off. Two hours into the flight, Mokichi's airplane experiences mechanical troubles and returns to Tokyo; Mokichi's unexpected return home surprises his wife. Mokichi says that he is hungry and Taeko suggests a meal. Not wishing to wake up their servant Fumi, the couple make their way to the unfamiliar to them kitchen where they prepare ochazuke, rice with green tea. In the process of doing that together, they make up, with Mokichi saying that this was his happiest day since he married her. Taeko understands what her husband has been speaking earlier about simpler pleasures. She apologizes profusely and promises never to leave without a word again. Mokichi accepts, telling her to say no more.

The film ends with Setsuko confiding with Noboru over her aunt's changed attitude. The final scene shows them walking away, arguing in a somewhat playful manner, suggesting that the two have become a couple.

Cast 
 Shin Saburi as Mokichi Satake
 Michiyo Kogure as Taeko Satake
 Kōji Tsuruta as Non-chan / Noboru Okada
 Chishū Ryū as Sadao Hirayama
 Chikage Awashima as Aya Amamiya
 Keiko Tsushima as Setsuko Yamauchi
 Kuniko Miyake as Chizu Yamauchi
 Eijirō Yanagi as Naosuke Yamauchi

Production

Writing
The script for the film was originally written by Yasujirō Ozu under the title "Kareshi Nankin e Iku" (彼氏南京へ行く, translation "Boyfriend is going to Nanjing") in 1939, with a story concerning a man about to be sent abroad on military service, rather than the business trip to Uruguay in the eventual film. In 1940 it was retitled "O-chazuke no aji" and went into preparation for production. However, the military censors demanded that the script be completely rewritten, for example demanding that the humble "ochazuke" dish mentioned in the title be changed to the celebratory dish of red beans and rice, because the man was leaving to serve in the army. Ozu then shelved the project.

Reception
In 1973, Vincent Canby wrote that The Flavor of Green Tea over Rice "is not great Ozu. There are times—especially in its subplot about a girl who refuses traditional wedding arrangements—when it is almost formula comedy." Canby also said, however, that Kogure and Saburi's characters "become such appealing characters, touched by a kind of nobility", and noted that "Ozu never wastes our interest on connecting scenes if we can take them for granted. When he does show us a man proceeding, say from one office to another, it becomes important, perhaps as an acknowledgment of time lost or as a sort of film equivalent to the white space between the chapters in a novel."

Dave Kehr of the Chicago Reader marked the film as "Recommended". Praising Ozu's melodramas for "avoid[ing] any sense of cliché in their restrained, sometimes painfully subtle study of family relationships", Kehr argued Ozu's "lack of camera movement sometimes speaks more than the elaborate techniques of his contemporaries."

 Mainichi Film Award for Best Actor : Shin Saburi.

References

Sources

External links
 
The Flavor of Green Tea Over Rice, Ozu-san.
The Flavor of Green Tea over Rice: Acquired Tastes an essay by Junji Yoshida at the Criterion Collection

1952 films
1952 drama films
Japanese drama films
Japanese black-and-white films
Films directed by Yasujirō Ozu
Films with screenplays by Yasujirō Ozu
Films with screenplays by Kogo Noda
Films set in Tokyo
Films scored by Ichirō Saitō
Shochiku films
1950s Japanese films